Elmfield is a suburb of the town of Ryde on the Isle of Wight, in England.  It is situated south-east of the town centre on a small hill.  St John's Church is a notable landmark on the north side of Elmfield.  Oakfield lies directly to the West, Appley to the North, Seaview and Nettlestone to the East and Westridge to the South.

The community is mainly based on the A3055 Marlborough Road, with additional shopping facilities in nearby Somerset Road. Public transport is provided by Southern Vectis buses on route 3. The nearest railway station is Ryde St John's Road, situated in lower Oakfield.

Villages on the Isle of Wight